Daniel Boháč (born February 13, 1980) is a Czech professional ice hockey player. He played with BK Mladá Boleslav in the Czech Extraliga during the 2010–11 Czech Extraliga season.

References

External links

1980 births
Living people
BK Mladá Boleslav players
Czech ice hockey forwards
Sportspeople from Opava
Motor České Budějovice players
HC Slovan Ústečtí Lvi players
HC Slezan Opava players
Fresno Falcons players
Colorado Eagles players
HC Havířov players
Spokane Chiefs players
Czech expatriate ice hockey players in the United States
Czech expatriate sportspeople in France
Expatriate ice hockey players in France